Assaf El-Murr (born 7 November 1967) is a Lebanese judoka. He competed in the men's half-lightweight event at the 1992 Summer Olympics.

References

1967 births
Living people
Lebanese male judoka
Olympic judoka of Lebanon
Judoka at the 1992 Summer Olympics
Place of birth missing (living people)